Turrawulla is a rural locality in the Isaac Region, Queensland, Australia.

Geography
One branch of Starvation Creek rises in the locality and flows to the north.

References 

Isaac Region
Localities in Queensland